The 2021 Wolffkran Open was a professional tennis tournament played on carpet courts. It was the fifth edition of the tournament which was part of the 2021 ATP Challenger Tour. It took place in Ismaning, Germany between 25 and 31 October 2021.

Singles main draw entrants

Seeds

 1 Rankings are as of 18 October 2021.

Other entrants
The following players received wildcards into the singles main draw:
  Max Hans Rehberg
  Mats Rosenkranz
  Henri Squire

The following player received entry into the singles main draw using a protected ranking:
  Yannick Maden

The following players received entry into the singles main draw as alternates:
  Tobias Kamke
  Vitaliy Sachko

The following players received entry from the qualifying draw:
  Matthias Bachinger
  Jonáš Forejtek
  Julian Lenz
  Otto Virtanen

The following player received entry as a lucky loser:
  Hiroki Moriya

Champions

Singles

  Oscar Otte def.  Lukáš Lacko 6–4, 6–4.

Doubles

  Andre Begemann /  Igor Zelenay def.  Marek Gengel /  Tomáš Macháč 6–2, 6–4.

References

Wolffkran Open
2021
2021 in German tennis
October 2021 sports events in Germany